Liaquat Pur railway station (Urdu and ) is located in Liaquat Pur on main railway line. From north it becomes the first railway station in Rahim Yar Khan district. The railway station is centered in the city's territory as it divides the city into two parts. The right side of the city is called Kachi Mandi while the opposite is known as Pakki Mandi. The railway line was first planned in 1883 when it was in British India. In 1889 a single line of a Broad gauge was laid. Later it became a two line link and in 1903 a station was built here and was named after this town "Chaudri". After the independence of Pakistan, in 1956 the name was changed to Liaquat Pur in honour of Pakistan's first Prime Minister Liaquat Ali Khan.

See also
 List of railway stations in Pakistan
 Pakistan Railways
 Liaquat Pur
 History of rail transport in Pakistan
 Ministry of Railways (Pakistan)
 Transport in Pakistan

References

External links
 Aerial View of Railway Station

Railway stations in Rahim Yar Khan District
Railway stations on Karachi–Peshawar Line (ML 1)